Mutant is the fifth album by American hip-hop duo Twiztid. Released on July 26, 2005, it is the second half of the Man's Myth/Mutant double album, released one month after its companion album, Man's Myth. On November 4, 2015, Twiztid announced they were remixing and remastering Mutant for a 2016 re-release.

Music and lyrics 
While Man's Myth featured a hip-hop-oriented sound, Mutant featured a hard rock sound. According to Jamie Spaniolo, "I've always wanted to do a Rock album and to date that was the closest thing to it we have ever done, so it holds a special place in my heart."

AllMusic said that "the sound of this album is far closer to Eminem's side of the Detroit hip-hop axis, specifically the cartoonish but musically fierce live-instruments-plus-samples sound of the best D12 tracks."

Reception 

AllMusic wrote that Mutant was better than its predecessor, Man's Myth; Allmusic also said that Mutant is "the best album of Twiztid's career, [...] the one on which the duo finally steps out from the shadow of their mentors the Insane Clown Posse".

Track listing

Charts

References 

2005 albums
Twiztid albums
Hard rock albums by American artists
Psychopathic Records albums